Torna atrás or Tornatrás is a term once used in 18th century Casta paintings to portray a mestizo or mixed-race person who showed phenotypic characteristics of only one of the "original races", such as European or Amerindian ancestry. The term was also used to describe an individual whose parentage was half white and half "albino".

Colonial Spanish America
The term torna atrás (in English, similar in meaning to "throwback" or "harken back to") could also refer to the appearance of racial characteristics not visible in the parents. An example is the child of a white person and a light-skinned person of African ancestry (albino) born with darker skin than their African-descended parent.  

The term torna atrás does not appear as a legal category in colonial documentation, but it is often shown in families portrayed in casta paintings in eighteenth-century Mexico.

Philippines
The term tornatrás was also used in the Philippines during the Spanish colonial era from the 16th to 19th century, to describe persons of mixed Austronesian (referred to as Indio), Chinese (referred to as Sangley), and Spanish ancestry (referred to as Filipinos/Insulares or Peninsulares), or just mixed Chinese and Spanish ancestry.

A number of Filipino people today would have been classified as Tornatrás under this system due to centuries of intermarriage among various foreign and indigenous ethnic groups throughout the islands.

History
Although Tornatrás was originally used to describe a descendant of mestizos, albinos and Europeans, in the Philippines they were commonly known as those born from a Spanish father ('Filipino' or 'peninsular') and a mixed native and Chinese (mestiza de sangley) mother or a pure-blooded Chinese mother; they can be born to a mixed native and Spanish parent and a mixed native and Chinese parent. Most people of the Tornatrás caste in the Philippines used Spanish as their primary language, and in many cases converted to the Catholic faith. Examples of famous Tornatrás persons in colonial history are José Rizal, Andrés Bonifacio, and Manuel Quezon.

There are no official statistics on the number of people of Tornatrás ancestry around the world. Given historical and colonial patterns, it is believed that most are to be found in South America (including Peru, where the largest Asian population of mostly Chinese and Japanese blood lives) and the Philippines.

See also
Castas
Filipino mestizo
Eurasian (mixed ancestry)
Miscegenation 
Morisco
Mulato
Atavism
Passing (racial identity)
Sandra Laing

Notes
Should not be confused with Albinism

References

Ethnonyms
Spanish words and phrases
History of the Philippines (1565–1898)
Multiracial affairs